The Bir el Qutt inscriptions are four Old Georgian Byzantine mosaic inscriptions in the  Asomtavruli script.

The complex was built of reddish limestone. The excavations has also revealed a monastery which produced wine and olive oil. Georgian inscriptions were found on a mosaic floor decorated with geometrical and floral patterns. The first two inscriptions are dated AD 430, while the last two AD 532. The excavations of Bir el Qutt conditioned discovery of inscriptions where only one has survived completely while others lack parts of the mosaic that suffered significant damage. The inscriptions in memoriam mention Peter the Iberian alongside his father, and also Bacurius the Iberian who is thought to be a possible maternal great-uncle or grandfather of Peter. Peter reputedly was the founder or the renovator of the monastery. Peter's aristocratic descent would allow him easy access to various persons of power and prestige in Constantinople, Jerusalem and other places, to actively develop Georgian monastic establishments. At the end of the eighth century the monastery was completely abandoned.

So far, the first two carvings alongside the Georgian graffiti of Nazareth and Sinai are the oldest extant Georgian inscriptions. The inscriptions are kept at the museum of the Studium Biblicum Franciscanum in Jerusalem. Inscription 2 mentioning Peter the Iberian is currently missing and is deemed to be lost.

Inscriptions

Inscription 1
ႣႠႻႭჃႻ
ႤႭჃႪႬႨႫ
ႠႧႬႨႡႠ
ႩႭჃႰႣႠ
ႢႰႨႭႰႫ
ႨႦႣႣႠႬ
ႠႸႭႡႬႨ
ႫႠႧႬႨႵ
Translation: Jesus Christ, have mercy on Bakur and Griormizd and their descendants.

This inscription was discovered to the west of the colonnade of central yard. The letters were arranged within three squares with black pebbles on white background. The carving of the inscription also differentiates from the other ones as the letters are comparatively rough. The text of the inscription is rather short, but an interesting thing is that out of two persons mentioned in the text the name of one of them repeats the name of prominent possible grandfather of Peter, Bakur the Iberian. The second person "Gri Ormizd" mentioned in the inscription is unknown, although as the inscription explains they were friends or relatives who grew up together.

Inscription 2
ႼႫႨႣႠႭႧႤႭႣႭႰ
ႤႫႠႰႭჃႠႬႣႠႡႭ
ჃႰႦႬ[...]ႤႬႠႫႨ[...]Ⴄ
Translation: Saint Theodore, have mercy on Maruan and Burzen, Amen.

Maruan was a secular name of Peter the Iberian. His father is mentioned as Burzen. Syriac edition of the 6th century “Vita” of Peter provides their names as "Nabarnugios" and "Buzmarios", while the 13th century Georgian edition of the Vita refers them as "Murvanos" and "Varaz-Bakur" respectively. It is assumed that these names in Syriac edition have the Greek ending "-os". Buzmar is the same name as Buzmihr and it is concluded that full name of the father of Peter was to be "Burzen-Mihr". The name "Varaz-Bakur" is thought to be the mistake made by the author of Georgian edition. "Burzen" represents the Parthian form and is represented with many various forms in different sources such as Burzin, Burz, Borzin, Barzi, Barzen, Baraz, Barza. Syriac edition has secular name of Peter as John Rufus mentions Peter in the text as "Nabarnugios". John being his contemporary and follower, was certainly aware of a real name of his spiritual confessor prior to becoming the monk. Peter being referenced under the inscription by his secular name does signify that the inscription itself had been made before Peter entered the monkhood.

Inscription 3

ႸႤႼႤႥႬႨႧႠႵჁႱႨႧႠႣႠႫ
ႤႭႾႤႡႨႧႠႼႫႨႣႨႱႠႣႠႧႤჂႱႨႧႠ
ႸႬႠႬႲႭႬႨႠႡႠჂႣႠႨႭႱႨႠႫႭ
ႫႱႾႫႤႪႨႠႫႨႱႱႤႴႨႱႠჂႣႠႫႠ
ႫႠႣႤႣႠჂႨႭႱႨႠჂႱႨႠႫႤႬ
Translation: With the help of Jesus Christ and Saint Theodore, God have mercy on Abba Antony and Iosia the layer of this mosaic and the father and mother of Iosia, Amen.

This five-line mosaic inscription was set in a tabula ansata, placed on the floor of the refectory hall of the monastery. Asomtavruli letters and the frame are made of black tessera on the white background and the mosaic's state of preservation is excellent. Iosia (i.e. Josiah) in the inscription is referenced as "master of mosaics". The name “Josiah” is unknown for Georgian nomenclature of that time. It is the Jewish personal name, represented with the Greek form, a name is not known by other sources. It seems that he was a Christian and is mentioned in the inscription together with his parents. Some scholars consider Josiah to be the person who provided the funds for mosaic in the church. Abba Anthony is identified by scholars with the Jerusalemite Georgian monk and priest Amba Anthony (fl. 596) who had been mentioned in several Georgian sources, who was connected with Simeon Stylites the Younger. Per sources he brought to Simeon the relics of the True Cross, later stayed in Syria, where he became a bishop.

Inscription 4
[...]
Ⴆ[...]
Ⴈ[...]
CO[...]
MCO[...]
Translation: [...]z[...]i[...]CO[...]MCO[...]

The fourth mosaic inscription is too fragmentary to propose a reading. It was found at the eastern portico of the courtyard.

See also
Bolnisi inscriptions
Umm Leisun inscription

Notes

References

Bibliography
Corbo, V. C. (1955) Gli scavi di Kh. Siyar el-Ghanam (Campo dei pastori) e i monasteri dei dintorni, Tip. dei PP. Francescani
Tchekhanovets, Y. (2018) The Caucasian Archaeology of the Holy Land: Armenian, Georgian and Albanian communities between the fourth and eleventh centuries CE, Brill Publishers, 
Khurtsilava, B. (2017) The inscriptions of the Georgian Monastery in Bi’r el-Qutt and their chronology. Journal"Christianity in the Middle East", No 1, Moscow, pp.129-151 https://www.academia.edu/45335011/The_inscriptions_of_the_Georgian_Monastery_in_Bir_el_Qutt_and_their_chronology_CHRISTIANITY_IN_THE_MIDDLE_EAST_No_1_2017_pp_129_151
Khurtsilava, B. (2018) Traces of the Georgians on the Holy Land, Tbilisi, 
 
Rayfield, D. (2013) Edge of Empires: A History of Georgia, Reaktion Books, 
De Gruyter (2018) Iudaea / Idumaea: 2649-3324, Part 1, LXXIV, 
Horn, C. B. (2006) Asceticism and Christological Controversy in Fifth-Century Palestine, The Career of Peter the Iberian, Oxford University Press,

Further reading 
Hewitt, B.G. (1995). Georgian: A Structural Reference Grammar. John Benjamins Publishing. .
Djobadze, W. (1976) Materials for the study of Georgian monasteries in the Western environs of Antioch on the Orontes, Volume 48; Volume 372, Corpussco
Tsereteli, G. (1961) The oldest Georgian inscriptions from Palestine, Tbilisi, 1960
Chachanidze, V. (1977) Peter the Iberian and the archaeological excavations of Georgian monastery in Jerusalem, Tbilisi

External links
Lombardo, S. & Scardigno, C. (2018) I mosaici di Bir el-Qutt, tra le più antiche testimonianze di lingua georgiana Terra Sancta Museum
Survey of Western Palestine, Map 17:  IAA, Wikimedia commons

Georgian inscriptions
Archaeological artifacts
Earliest known manuscripts by language
5th-century inscriptions
6th-century inscriptions
5th century in the Byzantine Empire
6th century in the Byzantine Empire
1952 archaeological discoveries
Classical sites in Jerusalem
Byzantine mosaics
Archaeological sites in the West Bank
Judaean Desert